Quand tout Recommence is the third French and twelfth overall studio album by Australian singer and songwriter Tina Arena, which was released on 6 April 2018, in France.

The album title, Quand tout Recommence translates to mean When Everything Restarts in English. Arena has stated that when she records in the French language, she is careful not to record French versions of her English language hits, as the meaning of the lyrics differ between languages. Arena notes that too often the intention of the song gets "lost in translation", therefore she has always chosen to write in both languages.

Track listing

Charts

Release history

References

2018 albums
Tina Arena albums
French-language albums